Dutton is a civil parish in Ribble Valley, Lancashire, England, located to the northeast of Ribchester.  The parish is rural, with the River Ribble running to the south.  It contains 15 buildings that are recorded in the National Heritage List for England as designated listed buildings.  These mainly consist of houses with related structures, or farm buildings, but there are also a church, a bridge and two cross bases.

Key

Buildings

References

Citations

Sources

Lists of listed buildings in Lancashire
Buildings and structures in Ribble Valley